The 2014 6 Hours of Bahrain was an endurance sports car racing event held on the Grand Prix Circuit, of the Bahrain International Circuit, Sakhir, Bahrain from 13–15 November 2014, and served as the seventh, and penultimate race of the 2014 FIA World Endurance Championship season. The race was won by Alexander Wurz, Stéphane Sarrazin and Mike Conway driving the No. 7 Toyota TS040 Hybrid car. Their team-mates Sébastien Buemi and Anthony Davidson secured the World Endurance Drivers' Championship at the event after finishing in 11th place.

Qualifying

Qualifying result
Pole position winners in each class are marked in bold.

Race

Race result
Class winners in bold.

References

8 Hours of Bahrain
6 Hours of Bahrain
Bahrain
6 Hours of Bahrain